The Shelburne dike, also known as the Great Dike, is a large northeast trending Mesozoic diabase dike in southwestern Nova Scotia, Canada. The dike might have fed volcanoes in the Triassic period when the landscape was rifting apart during the breakup of supercontinent Pangaea.

See also
Volcanism of Canada
Volcanism of Eastern Canada

References

Igneous rocks
Igneous petrology of Nova Scotia
Mesozoic volcanism